Festuca glacialis is a species of grass in the family Poaceae. This species is natve to France, and Spain. It is perennial and prefers subalpine or subarctic biomes. Festuca glacialis was first described in 1890.

References

glacialis